Eliomar Correia Silva (born 16 March 1988) is a Brazilian professional footballer who plays as an attacking midfielder for Serbian club Javor Ivanjica.

Career
Born in Salvador, Eliomar started out at his hometown club Vitória. He would later move to different state to start his senior career with Cardoso Moreira. During the 2008 Campeonato Carioca, Eliomar made eight appearances in the process, as the team suffered relegation to the second level of football in Rio de Janeiro.

In August 2008, Eliomar moved abroad to Serbian club Javor Ivanjica. He made his league debut for the side in a 2–2 away draw against Partizan on 18 October 2008. In the heights of his spell in Ivanjica, Eliomar netted a hat-trick to give his team a 3–1 over OFK Beograd on 29 September 2012. He amassed a total of 95 league appearances and scored 11 goals for Javor in the top flight of Serbian football.

On 17 January 2013, Eliomar was transferred to Partizan. He signed a three-and-a-half-year contract and was given the number 10 shirt. On 2 March 2013, Eliomar made his competitive debut for the club in their 2–0 home league win over Donji Srem. He appeared in six more league games until the end of the 2012–13 season, as Partizan won the title.

On 15 July 2013, Eliomar joined Hungarian side Kecskemét on a season-long loan. He collected 16 appearances across all competitions over the course of the 2013–14 campaign, scoring three goals. In the summer of 2014, Eliomar went to Greece on loan to Pierikos, but switched to fellow Football League club Larissa midway through the 2014–15 season.

Career statistics

Honours
Partizan
 Serbian SuperLiga: 2012–13

References

External links
 
 
 

Athlitiki Enosi Larissa F.C. players
Association football midfielders
Brazilian expatriate footballers
Brazilian expatriate sportspeople in Bosnia and Herzegovina
Brazilian expatriate sportspeople in Greece
Brazilian expatriate sportspeople in Hungary
Brazilian expatriate sportspeople in Serbia
Brazilian footballers
Expatriate footballers in Bosnia and Herzegovina
Expatriate footballers in Greece
Expatriate footballers in Hungary
Expatriate footballers in Serbia
FK Inđija players
FK Javor Ivanjica players
FK Mladost Lučani players
FK Partizan players
FK Zlatibor Čajetina players
Football League (Greece) players
Kecskeméti TE players
Nemzeti Bajnokság I players
NK Široki Brijeg players
Pierikos F.C. players
Premier League of Bosnia and Herzegovina players
Serbian First League players
Serbian SuperLiga players
Sportspeople from Salvador, Bahia
1988 births
Living people